Maurice Harry Rapf (May 19, 1914 – April 15, 2003) was an American screenwriter and professor of film studies. His work includes the screenplays for early Disney live-action features Song of the South (1946) and So Dear to My Heart (1949), uncredited work on the screenplay for the animated feature Cinderella (1950), and several films of the late 1930s. He was a co-founder of the Screen Writers Guild. He was blacklisted in 1947 due to his association with the Communist Party USA. He later taught film studies at Dartmouth College.

Personal life
Rapf was Jewish, the son of Harry Rapf, an executive and film producer at Metro-Goldwyn-Mayer Studios, and worked briefly for his father as a child actor. He had a brother Matthew Rapf, known for producing the TV series Kojak and other television and film work.

In 1934, while majoring in English at Dartmouth, Rapf visited the Soviet Union as an exchange student, where he was impressed by the presentation of Communism he was shown. Despite the danger to a Jew visiting Berlin at that time, he stopped there on the way home, an experience which he described in his autobiography as convincing him that Communism was the only thing capable of defeating Hitler, and greatly influenced his political views. He graduated in 1935, and moved to Hollywood.

In January 1939, he married actress Louise Seidel, a Catholic, over the objections of their parents. They had two daughters (Joanna and Geraldine) and a son (William).

Hollywood career
In Hollywood, he joined the Communist Party USA, and remained active in the party even after other Jewish sympathizers became disillusioned with it over Moscow's attempted appeasement of Hitler before World War 2. He became an advocate for the rights of creative professionals, and helped found the Screen Writers Guild (one of the groups that formed into the Writers Guild of America, West).

He entered the "family business" of film-making, and co-wrote screenplays for We Went to College (1936), They Gave Him a Gun (1937), and The Bad Man of Brimstone (1937). He went on to work on action films such as Sharpshooters (1938) and North of Shanghai (1939). When F. Scott Fitzgerald became incapacitated by drinking, Rapf replaced him co-scripting Winter Carnival (1939), a film about the Dartmouth traditional event, which Rapf later described as a "clinker".

In 1944 Rapf was recruited by Walt Disney to work on the screenplay for Song of the South (1946), from a treatment by screenwriting newcomer Dalton Reymond. According to journalist Neal Gabler, one of the reasons Disney hired Rapf was to temper what Disney feared would be Reymond's white Southern slant:Rapf was a minority, a Jew, and an outspoken left-winger, and he himself feared that the film would inevitably be Uncle Tomish. "That's exactly why I want you to work on it," Walt told him, "because I know that you don't think I should make the movie. You're against Uncle Tomism, and you're a radical."Rapf initially hesitated to work on an animated film, but when he found out that most of the film would be live-action and was told that he could make extensive changes, he accepted the offer. Rapf worked on the project for about seven weeks, but when he got into a personal dispute with Reymond, he was taken off it, and assigned to work on the script for Cinderella (1950).

His version of Cinderella was written to be a less passive character than Snow White, and more rebellious against her stepfamily. Rapf explained, "My thinking was you can't have somebody who comes in and changes everything for you. You can't be delivered it on a platter. You've got to earn it. So in my version, the Fairy Godmother said, 'It's okay till midnight but from then on it's up to you.' I made her earn it, and what she had to do to achieve it was to rebel against her stepmother and stepsisters, to stop being a slave in her own home. So I had a scene where they're ordering her around and she throws the stuff back at them. She revolts, so they lock her up in the attic. I don't think anyone took (my idea) very seriously."

In July 1946, Rapf was one of several people listed in a column by The Hollywood Reporter publisher William Wilkerson, identifying them as Communists and sympathizers. "Billy's List" formed the basis for what became the Hollywood Blacklist, and while Rapf was excused from testifying to the House Unamerican Activities Committee due to illness, being summoned effectively ended his career in the industry. His work on Cinderella, which he tried to imbue with a sense of the class struggle, was not credited. He did some further writing for film and television using "fronts" and pseudonyms, including Father Brown (aka, The Detective, 1954) starring Alec Guinness.

After Hollywood

In 1949, he moved with his family to Sergeantsville, New Jersey, and worked briefly in New York as an industrial film writer. In 1951 he moved to Norwich, Vermont (near Dartmouth College), where he helped establish the Dartmouth Film Society. In the early 1950s, he relocated to New York, where he pursued a career as a film critic (writing for Life and Family Circle magazines), and worked at Dynamic Films as a writer, director, and producer of commercial and industrial films.

In 1967, he returned to Dartmouth to teach film studies, becoming a full-time member of the faculty in 1976. He had one additional screenwriting credit in 1980: the 45-minute made-for-television animated film Gnomes which was nominated for an Emmy for Outstanding Animated Program. Late in life he wrote an autobiography entitled Back Lot: Growing Up With the Movies (1999), and All About the Movies: A Handbook for the Movie-Loving Layman (2000).

Filmography
Divorce in the Family – 1932
We Went to College – 1936
They Gave Him a Gun – 1937
The Bad Man of Brimstone – 1937
Island in the Sky – 1938
Sharpshooters – 1938
North of Shanghai – 1939
Winter Carnival – 1939
Dancing on a Dime – 1940
Jennie – 1940
Call of the Canyon – 1942
Song of the South – 1946
So Dear to My Heart – 1948
Cinderella (uncredited) – 1950
Father Brown (aka, The Detective, uncredited) – 1954
Gnomes – 1980

References

External links

1914 births
2003 deaths
American humanities academics
American male screenwriters
Dartmouth College alumni
Dartmouth College faculty
Hollywood blacklist
Jewish American dramatists and playwrights
Members of the Communist Party USA
American male dramatists and playwrights
20th-century American dramatists and playwrights
Screenwriters from New Hampshire
20th-century American male writers
20th-century American screenwriters